Nicholas Gilbert (born 14 June 1963) is a former English cricketer.  Gilbert was a right-handed batsman.  He was born in East Ham, Essex.

Gilbert made his debut for Hertfordshire in the 1983 Minor Counties Championship against Norfolk.  Gilbert played Minor counties cricket for Hertfordshire from 1983 to 1999, which included 50 Minor Counties Championship matches and 18 MCCA Knockout Trophy matches.  He made his List A debut against Somerset in the 1984 NatWest Trophy.  He made 6 further List A appearances for the county, the last coming against Lancashire in the 1999 NatWest Trophy.  In his 7 List A matches, he scored 79 runs at an average of 15.80, with a high score of 33.

In 1982, he played for the Second XIs of Northamptonshire, Sussex, Derbyshire and Nottinghamshire.

References

External links
Nicholas Gilbert at ESPNcricinfo
Nicholas Gilbert at CricketArchive

1963 births
Living people
People from East Ham
English cricketers
Hertfordshire cricketers